Epiblema otiosana, the bidens borer moth, gets its common name from the genus Bidens which includes the food plants for the larva. An adults wingspan ranges from 12 to 20 mm. They range in North America from Maine and Ontario in the north, south to Florida and west to Kansas and Texas.

References 

 

Olethreutinae
Moths described in 1860